Cyril Bristow (1899–1978) was a British cinematographer who worked on roughly thirty films during the 1930s and 1940s at a variety of British studios.

Selected filmography
 The Love Contract (1932)
 The Mayor's Nest (1932)
 Up to the Neck (1933)
 General John Regan (1933)
 Up for the Derby (1933)
 It's a King (1933)
 Sorrell and Son (1934)
 Dangerous Ground (1934)
 It's a Cop (1934)
 Lilies of the Field (1934)
 Girls, Please! (1934)
 Radio Parade of 1935 (1934)
 Hyde Park Corner (1935)
 The Gay Adventure (1936)
 The Limping Man (1936)
 The Cardinal (1936)
 Big Fella (1937)
 Boys Will Be Girls (1937)
 Cotton Queen (1937)
 Midnight Menace (1937)
 Follow Your Star (1938)
 Escape from Broadmoor (1948)
 Stop Press Girl (1949)
 Boys in Brown (1949)
 The Man from Yesterday (1949)

Bibliography
 Nollen, Scott Allen. Paul Robeson: Film Pioneer. McFarland, 2010.

References

External links

1899 births
1978 deaths
British cinematographers
People from Medway